Off The Kerb Productions is a British talent agency company that mainly works with comedians.

The company was owned by Addison Cresswell. The company is responsible for many comedians, including Jack Dee, Lee Evans, Jeremy Hardy, Jo Brand, Alan Carr, Marcus Brigstocke, Rich Hall, Michael McIntyre and negotiated an £18 million deal for Jonathan Ross. Prior to his death, Cresswell was also a director of Open Mike Productions and Little Mo Films, which both make comedy programming for British television.

They currently manage 57 artists and performers.

Artists represented

Tom Allen
Charlie Baker
Angela Barnes
Jo Brand
Kevin Bridges
Marcus Brigstocke
Alan Carr
Paul Chowdhry
Ali Cook
Tim Clark
Marlon Davis
Dead Cat Bounce
Jack Dee
Neil Delamere
Lee Evans
Simon Evans
Dave Fulton
Ivo Graham
John Gordillo
Jeff Green
Rich Hall
Adam Hills
Phill Jupitus
Shappi Khorsandi
Tom Lucy
Alistair McGowan
Michael McIntyre
Dara Ó Briain
Andy Parsons
Emo Philips
Al Porter
Jon Richardson
Andy Robinson
Jonathan Ross
Suzi Ruffell
Mark Steel
Seann Walsh
Gavin Webster
Josh Widdicombe
Mike Wilmot
Richard Morton

References

External links
Official website for Off The Kerb Productions

Talent and literary agencies